Cundiff is an unincorporated hamlet in northeastern Jack County, Texas. It was named for Harrell Cundiff, one of the first settlers of Jack County. There is a church there, and an outfitter, but no other businesses or services.

Pre-History
Settlement in the region began in 1855. In 1858, the Butterfield Overland Mail established Earhart's Station, on the west bank of Big Creek, at Hogeye, or Hog Eye Prairie a prosperous ranch there managed by Joseph B. Earhart.  A school and a church were located nearby and before 1860 a sizable settlement.  The station operated until 1860, when the mail route was diverted to another route to Jacksboro via Decatur due to the building of a new toll bridge at Bridgeport, that avoided delays crossing the West Fork of the Trinity River when it was flooded.  In the 1860s Comanche raids forced many settlers to abandon their homesteads in the area until the removal of the Indian threat in the mid-1870s, when settlers began returning to the Cundiff area.

History
No permanent community was established until the early 1890s, when in 1891 Walker Moore subdivided a tract of land into small farms and laid out a townsite, which he named Cundiff. The town had a post office from 1891 to 1918. By the early 1900s it also had a cotton gin, a blacksmith shop, four stores, and a school. In 2000 the population of the town was forty-five.

References

 Thomas F. Horton, History of Jack County,  Gazette Print, Jacksboro, Texas, (1935).
 Ida Lasater Huckabay, Ninety-Four Years in Jack County,  Steck, Austin: 1949; centennial ed., Texian Press, Waco, (1974).

Populated places in Jack County, Texas
Towns in Texas